George A. McMillan (1863–1920) was an American professional baseball player. He played ten games for the New York Giants of Major League Baseball's National League during the 1890 season.

Sources

1863 births
1920 deaths
19th-century baseball players
Canadian expatriate baseball players in the United States
Canton Deubers players
Major League Baseball outfielders
New York Giants (NL) players
Major League Baseball players from Canada
Duluth Jayhawks players
Duluth Freezers players
Lima Lushers players
Toronto Canucks players
Terre Haute Hottentots players
Evansville Hoosiers players
Phillipsburg Burgers players